Tomás Vio (25 July 1921 – 5 December 2001) was an Argentine basketball player who competed in the 1948 Summer Olympics when they finished 15th. He played six games in his Olympic career.

References

Argentine men's basketball players
Olympic basketball players of Argentina
Basketball players at the 1948 Summer Olympics
1921 births
2001 deaths